Collections is the second album by rock band The Young Rascals. The album was released on January 9, 1967 and rose to #15 on the Billboard Top LPs chart, and #8 in Canada.

History
Collections was the Rascals' first album to showcase their songwriting talent, with six of the album's songs written by band members. On its original release, the song "Turn On Your Love Light" was incorrectly titled "Love Lights," and credited to The Sonics' bandleader Gerald (Gerry) Roslie, who had written a song called "Love Lights" for that band. Upon its release as a single, "I've Been Lonely Too Long" was credited to Cavaliere/Brigati, rather than to Felix Cavaliere alone.

The album featured two Top 20 U.S. hits: "I've Been Lonely Too Long" reached #16 on the Billboard Hot 100, while "Love Is a Beautiful Thing" (released as a double A-side with non-album single "You Better Run") preceded it at #20.

Reception

In his review for Allmusic, music critic Bruce Eder wrote the "garage rock" sound of the band's first album was gone and called it a "wonderfully soulful body of music that picks up right where 'In the Midnight Hour' from the prior album left off. Most of this record is among the most danceable white rock music of its period..."  The band was awarded a Gold Album in the United States for Collections.

Track listing

Side One
 "What Is the Reason" (Felix Cavaliere, Eddie Brigati) – 2:23
 "Since I Fell for You" (Buddy Johnson) – 3:25
 "(I've Been) Lonely Too Long" (Cavaliere) – 2:57
 "No Love to Give" (Gene Cornish) – 2:42
 "Mickey's Monkey" (Brian Holland, Lamont Dozier, Eddie Holland) / "Turn On Your Love Light" (Deadric Malone, Joe Scott) – 4:41

Side Two
 "Come On Up" (Cavaliere) – 2:41
 "Too Many Fish in the Sea" (Eddie Holland, Norman Whitfield) – 2:16
 "More" (Riz Ortolani, Nino Oliviero, Norman Newell, Marcello Ciorciolini) – 4:20
 "Nineteen Fifty-Six" (Danelli, Cornish) – 2:28
 "Love Is a Beautiful Thing" (Cavaliere, Brigati) – 2:30
 "Land of a Thousand Dances" (Chris Kenner) – 1:58

Certifications
US-Gold (500,000 copies sold).

Personnel

The Rascals
 Felix Cavaliere – organ, piano, vocals (tracks 1, 3, 5-7, 10)
 Eddie Brigati – percussion, vocals (tracks 2, 5, 8, 10, 11)
 Gene Cornish – guitar, bass, vocals (tracks 4, 9)
 Dino Danelli – drums

Singles
"You Better Run" (non-album single) / "Love Is a Beautiful Thing" (May 30, 1966) US: #20
"Come On Up" / "What Is the Reason" (September 12, 1966) US: #43
"I've Been Lonely Too Long" (2:04 edit) / "If You Knew" (January 16, 1967) US: #16

References

1967 albums
Atlantic Records albums
The Rascals albums
Albums produced by Eddie Brigati
Albums produced by David Brigati
Albums produced by Gene Cornish
Albums produced by Felix Cavaliere
Albums produced by Dino Danelli